Gonpo Tseten Rinpoche (1906–1991) was a Dzogchen master, an author, a painter, a sculptor, and a teacher from the Nyingma school of Tibetan Buddhism.

Biography
Gönpo Tseten was born in 1906 in Amdo, in the eastern province of Tibet, into a family of ngakpas. At the age of seven he was sent to Sangchen Mingye Ling, a Nyingmapa monastery. At the age of 15, having been identified as a potential future teacher, he studied with Kargi Tertön and accomplished the preliminary practices of Tibetan Buddhism.

At Sangchen Mingye Ling, Gönpo Tseten continued his Dharma studies and the traditional Tibetan arts and sciences. Around this time he began to display abilities in drawing, painting, and sculpture. In 1925, at the age of 18, he completed two images of Thousand-Armed Avalokiteshvara, each over six feet tall.

He then travelled twenty days in order to study for a year with the Tertön Choling Tuching Dorje, a disciple of Dodrupchen Rinpoche. He subsequently spent four months receiving the transmission and empowerments of the Rinchen Terdzod from the great Dzogchen master Bathur Khenpo Thubten Chöphel, who was also a guru of Dilgo Khyentse Rinpoche and the 6th Dzogchen Rinpoche. Later, the ngakpa Gönpo Tsering taught him Tu, the art of overcoming enemies. This was essential since his gompa in Amdo needed protection from surrounding afflictions, including ruthless bandits and wild animals. After this, he studied sutra and tantra, including the Yönten Dzö, at Sukchen Tago Gompa in Golok, which was established by the First Dodrupchen Rinpoche in 1799.

His student Ngawang Khedup, who studied with Lama Gönpo in Clement Town, Dhera Dun, India, and accompanied him when he went to the United States, reported that among the other places Gönpo Tseten studied in his youth was Rabgon Ngakmang, "the place of many Tantrikas", one of Tibet's tantric colleges, where the most secret yogic practices were taught in depth and practiced to completion. At the end of the tummo course, as a test of their accomplishment, the students went to the deep holes dug in the ground behind the buildings on a cold winter's night. The student would then go down to the bottom of a hole and see how many wet blankets could be dried out in a single night by inner heat. The students would also see how far that they could ascend into the air above the hole, to discover which among them could rise up the highest. "I was told," Ngawang wrote, "that people standing at a distance away could see Lama Gönpo rising above, not just the other yogis, but also the row of buildings that were in front!" Having himself brought tantric siddhis to fruition, Lama Gönpo emphasized to his students that such outward signs must be the fruit of inner realization rather than goals in themselves.

In 1932 he met his root guru, the Longchen Nyingtik lineage holder Patrul Rinpoche Kunzang Shenpen Özer of Tsö, the tulku of Patrul Rinpoche Chökyi Wangpo, who was himself a heart-son of Adzom Drukpa Drodul Pawo Dorje. According to the late Dilgo Khyentse Rinpoche, in his autobiography Brilliant Moon, Patrul Rinpoche of Tsö was an emanation of Avalokiteshvara and a very unusual person who would feed hundreds of beggars at his monastery upon condition that they enter the gate of the Dharma and undertake ngöndro preliminary practices.

Under his guru's direction he did Richö, a solitary mountain retreat, for four years including ngöndro, tsa-lung, and Dzogchen, progressing through the stages of the path to the realization of the supreme state. At the end of his retreat, Patrul Rinpoche of Tsö asked him to teach others. In 1936 he was given the role of vajra acharya to teach Patrul Rinpoche's disciples in the master's absence. He was also given the knowledge-holder name Rigdzin Trinlé Özer.

For two years he taught tsa-lung and Dzogchen at Patrul Rinpoche's monastery in Tsö. He then did further retreat for one year to deepen his realization before going to Dzogchen Monastery in 1939 and 1940. Lama Gönpo then returned to his own gompa, Sangchen Mingye Ling, bringing with him the Kangyur, Rigdzin Jigmé Lingpa's Ton Bum, Yonden Subdon, and other profound texts totaling 1,552 pages.

At Sangchen Mingye Ling he became khenpo, and also did another several years in retreat. Converting his monastery to one which concentrated on the Longchen Nyingtik teachings of Rigdzin Jigmé Lingpa he would teach the Kunzang Lamé Shyalung of Patrul Chökyi Wangpo. In the winter he taught tsa-lung, and in the summer, Yeshe Lama. His fame spread far and wide like the rays of the sun.

Numerous lamas asked him to teach at their gompas. He taught at eight monasteries throughout Amdo, teaching twice a year at each. From 1957 to 1959 he taught at the renowned Tsering Jong Monastery of Kunkhyen Jigme Lingpa himself near Lhasa.

Life outside Tibet (1959-1982) 
In 1959, Lama Gönpo managed to escape from Tibet. Having arrived in India, Lama Gönpo steadfastly continued to teach the Dharma far and wide, and received numerous teachings from other exiled teachers. There, he wrote a compact edition of the Kunzang Lamé Shyalung. To dispel obstacles, he did a three-month retreat on Vajrakilaya at the residence of the Dalai Lama. At the end of his retreat the Dalai Lama presented him with an offering of a phurba hidden as a terma treasure by Padmasambhava, Guru Rinpoche, and discovered by the great terton Nyang Ral Nyima Özer (1124–1192), the first of the five sovereign terma revealers. Much later, since no material object was important to him in the least unless it could serve the dharma, due to his foreknowledge, at the appropriate time before he departed for the Copper-Coloured Mountain in 1991, Lama Gönpo transferred this precious artifact to a generous benefactor and gave all of the large donation he received to help fund the community of nuns he was guiding in Amdo.

From 1967 to 1978 Lama Gönpo taught at the Nyingmapa Lamas College at Clement Town, Dehra Dun, India, teaching the entire range of the preliminary and advanced practices. In 1979 Lama Gönpo was requested to come and teach in the United States by Gyatrul Rinpoche. From 1979 to early 1982, accompanied by his consort Pema Lhanzam, he taught mainly in California, where he taught almost the entire Longchen Nyingtig cycle, including the Yeshe Lama to his devoted students. He was particularly skillful in his guidance of disciples, and could be very gentle, paternal, warm, and encouraging or forthrightly challenging, always expecting those who studied with him to make the greatest possible effort in their practice.

Once, after the appearance of unmistakable signs, Lama Gönpo told a disciple, "You are definitely the incarnation of a yogi in Tibet who did a certain Dorje Phurba practice." When the student asked if it were possible to discover more about this, his teacher casually replied, "Of course, but inquiring into past lives is not important for most people. It takes away attention from the key point. The key point for is to bring to fulfillment the practice in this very lifetime." A few days thereafter the vidyadhara bestowed the necessary empowerments on the student in order for him to continue the path his teacher had identified.

While in America, Lama Gönpo was an inexhaustible river of extensive empowerments and teachings on every level of the Longchen Nyingtig, from teachings on the Nine Yanas, to Rigdzin Jigme Lingpa's kyérim text Staircase to Akanishtha, to one of the first comprehensive Chö empowerments and teachings given in North America, Laughter of the Dakinis, Phowa, Shitro, Rigdzin Düpa, among many others, as well as teachings on the nature of mind, both Semdé (Mind Category) and Longdé (Space Category) all the way up to and including the unsurpassed Yeshe Lama, all transmitted from the perspective of highest Dzogchen Atiyoga.

Before Lama Gönpo left the USA the first time, at a final interview with one of his students, who was himself embarking on the path of a spiritual teacher, the disciple humbly requested his root guru, "This is the last time we will meet in this life. What are your essential instructions for me?" The great vidyadhara answered simply, "Always teach pure dharma, and always rest in rigpa." In these two phrases Lama Gönpo Tseten set forth a succinct and accurate description of his own life and teaching.

Return to Tibet (1982-1991) 
When the Chinese government allowed exiled Tibetans to return in 1982, Lama Gönpo, then 76, returned to Amdo, the region of his birth, and gathered a dedicated community of practitioners, who were mainly nuns, to help in the revival of the Dharma in the Land of Snows. After visiting America once more for a brief period, Lama Gönpo remained in Tibet until his death at the age of 85.

He had no interest in founding organizations or building dharma centers and so left that activity for other masters to accomplish. Although he himself possessed unimpeded insight and had the power to authoritatively recognize and enthrone tulkus, which he occasionally did as he foresaw would be helpful, Lama Gönpo did not consider his own enthronement as a reincarnate master to be necessary and so dispensed with that formality.

As were Choje Longchen Rabjam, Kunkhyen Jigme Lingpa, and Jamyang Khyentse Wangpo, Gonpo Tseten Rinpoche was considered to be a secret emanation of Panchen Vimalamitra, who brought the Dzogchen teachings to Tibet. This fact is alluded to in his long life prayer, written by H.E. Dungse Thinley Norbu Rinpoche of Pemakö:

Of the millions of knowledge-holders
The chief is the Supreme Vimalamitra,
Whose light-ray sunlike activity you invite as guests
Into the lotus-like Wisdom Mansion of your heart.
Glorious teacher Rigdzin Trinley Ozer, may you live long.
The Dzogpa Chenpo is the Dakinis' luminous heart-essence,
The Supreme Dharma's excellent activity spread widely like pollen.
May your fortunate disciples gathering like bees to honey,
Fly in the Dharmakaya's sky.

Although he had planned to depart this world on the tenth day of the sixth Tibetan month, that day being special to Guru Rinpoche, Lama Gönpo kindly acceded to his students' request and delayed his departure three days. Like Kunzang Sherab the 1st Throneholder of Palyul, and Terdak Lingpa the founder of Mindrolling Monastery, just before his parinirvana the Vidyadhara Trinlé Özer, as he had predicted, saw the dakinis coming to convey his consciousness to the Copper-Coloured Mountain, Guru Rinpoche's pure land. Lama Gönpo made beautiful inviting mudras as his physical body was dying, and passed into the sphere of ultimate truth on the 13th day of the sixth Tibetan month in the Iron-Sheep Year of the 17th Rabjung, 1991.

Lama Gönpo mentioned in 1981 that he would not reincarnate as a conventional tulku, but would send emanations directly from the Copper Colored Mountain.

Personal life
About the age of twenty he married and had a son, Pema Rigdzin. After two years he and his wife separated. He later married again, this time to Drolma Chi, with whom he spent the remainder of his time in Tibet until 1959. Three years before the Chinese army arrived, he moved to Lhasa with his wife and son. During the Chinese invasion of Tibet, Gönpo Tseten became separated from his wife and son, who did not escape.

Writings
Some writings of Lama Gönpo Tseten Rinpoche (published under the name Gonpo Tseten):
Dorje Phurba: Developing and Completion Stage Practice (1962),
Preliminary Practices of the Longchen Nyingtik: a Commentary (1964),
Tsa-Lung: Completion Stage Practice (1966),
Life History of the Longchen Nyingtig Lamas: Longchenpa and Jigme Lingpa (1979),
In Praise of Longchenpa (1979),
The Life of Guru Rinpoche and the Meaning of the Tsog Offering (1981),
Kye Rim: A Developing Stage Practice of Rigdzin Dupa, and
Yonten Tso: a Comprehensive Nyingtig Text.

In addition to his own writings, in 1977 Lama Gönpo Tseten Rinpoche also published in Gangtok the following texts by Jamyang Khyentse Wangpo:

Immortal Celebration: the Empowerment Liturgy of the Text “Extracting the Essence for Prolonging Longevity" (a terma of the Fifth Dalai Lama),
A Rough List of Scholars and Translators of Tibet, the Land of Snow,
A Brief Account of the Throneholders of Both New and Old Tantric Schools of the Land of Snow: The Wondrous Lotus Garden.

Artistic accomplishments
Among Lama Gönpo Tseten's artistic works are two murals in Clement Town, Dhera Dun, India: "Amitabha in Dewachen" at Tashi Gommo Gelugpa Monastery, and "Mount Meru and the Universe System" at the Nyingmapa Lamas College. He also painted a large thangka of the Longchen Nyingtik Refuge Tree and smaller thangkas of Padmasambhava and Vajrakilaya, some of which he gave to Thinley Norbu Rinpoche. Subsequently, the main figure of Guru Rinpoche of Lama Gönpo's painting was used as the cover for the Padmakara Translation Group's translation of White Lotus by the 1st Jamgon Mipham Rinpoche.

References
Immortal Protector of Beings: A Brief Biography of Lama Gonpo Tseten, 1992; 
Lama Gonpo's published Curriculum Vitae, 1979 and 1980; 
Long Life Prayer of Rigdzin Trinley Ozer (Lama Gonpo Tseten) by Thinley Norbu Rinpoche, 1979; 
Booklet on the Vajrakilaya Empowerment which includes a biography of Lama Gonpo Tseten, 1980; 
The Nyingma School of Tibetan Buddhism by Jigdral Yeshe Dorje, Dudjom Rinpoche, Wisdom Publications, Boston Mass, 1991.

1906 births
1991 deaths
Buddhist artists
Dzogchen lamas
Nyingma lamas
Rinpoches
Tulkus
Tibetan Buddhism writers
Tibetan Buddhist spiritual teachers
Tibetan Buddhists from Tibet
Tibetan painters
20th-century Tibetan painters